is a two-part Japanese television special based on the popular manga of the same name by Keiji Nakazawa.

Plot
It was during the end of the war in Hiroshima. People in Japan were facing food shortages, and air bombing day and night. But, the government and its military powers, still continued the hopeless situation, and called young people to send them to battlefields. However, people were received letters that those young people had been lost. At that time in Japan, Daikichi was working as a picture drawer of Japanese footwear Geta. With his wife Kimie, Daikichi worked hard to raise their four little children.

Koji, the eldest brother, was nice and kind to his family. Eiko, the eldest sister, was weak in health, but doing daily chores to help her family. Gen, the naughty but cheerful kid and also nice to his family. The youngest boy Shinji was a pampered child. Kimie was pregnant, so they were going to have a new family member. When it is time to harvest the wheat from the fields outside of town, the children look forward to making bread and noodles to eat. Daikichi always said to his children, "Grow up as strong as the wheat".

Cast
 Ren Kobayashi as Gen Nakaoka, the main protagonist
 Gaku Yamamoto as an elderly Gen Nakaoka, the narrator
 Kiichi Nakai as Daikichi Nakaoka, Gen's father
 Yuriko Ishida as Kimie Nakaoka, Gen's mother
 Akiyoshi Nakao as Koji Nakaoka, Gen's elder brother
 Asuka Ono as Eiko Nakaoka, Gen's elder sister
 Yuki Imai as Shinji Nakaoka, Gen's younger brother, and Ryuta Kondo
 TBA as Tomoko Nakaoka, Gen's baby sister
 Masanobu Katsumura as Mr. Pak
 Kenichi Yajima as a chief police officer
 Hiroko Nakajima as Ume
 Isamu Ichikawa as Officer Hamada
 Kanako Fukaura as Hanako Yoshida
 Takeshi Masu as Commander Saeki
 Shinobu Tsuruta as Principal Tanaka
 Hiroshi Okouchi as Mr. Numata
 Sakura as Kikuyo
 Susumu Kobayashi as a doctor
 Takao Toji as a master of the house
 Yoji Tanaka as a military policeman
 Hiroki Narimiya as Seiji Yoshida
 Ryo as Kiyoko Hayashi
 Takehiro Murata as Shinsuke Takura
 Mitsuru Hirata as Dr. Yabe
 B-saku Sato as Eizo Yoshida
 Tokie Hidari as Setsu Hayashi
 Tetta Sugimoto as Kosaku
 Takehiko Ono as Denjiro Samejima
 Taro Yamashita as Tatsuo Hayasi
 Jyura Matsuura as Takeko Hayashi

Locations
 Hiroshima Film Commission
 Saga Pref Film Commission
 Ibaraki Film Commission
 Kagawa Film Commission
 Miroku no Sato in Fukuyama, Hiroshima
 Takeo, Joso, AP&PP Takahagi, Ishioka, Mitoyo
 Marugame Basara Map
 TV Shin-Hiroshima TSS TV Shin-Hiroshima
 Saga Television Station Saga TV

Theme song
 "Sen no Kaze ni Natte" ("A Thousand Winds")
 Sing by Masafumi Akikawa

DVD and soundtrack
DVD and soundtrack were released on January 25, 2008, from Pony Canyon.

See also
 Barefoot Gen
 Barefoot Gen - PART1 (1976)
 Barefoot Gen - PART2 (1977)
 Barefoot Gen - PART3 (1980)
 Barefoot Gen anime - PART1 (1983)
 Barefoot Gen 2 anime - PART2 (1986)
 Keiji Nakazawa

References

External links
 Hadashino Gen on Fuji TV official

See also
 Japanese television programs

2007 television films
2007 films
Japanese drama television series
Japanese television specials
Television shows about the atomic bombings of Hiroshima and Nagasaki
TV drama
Japanese television dramas based on manga
Japanese television films
Films set in Hiroshima
Films shot in Hiroshima
Films shot in Fukuyama
Television shows set in Hiroshima Prefecture

ja:はだしのゲン#テレビドラマ